Doryporellidae is a family of bryozoans belonging to the order Cheilostomatida.

Genera:
 Doryporella Norman, 1903
 Doryporellina Grischenko, Mawatari & Taylor, 2000

References

Cheilostomatida